Safaryan or in Western Armenian Safarian is a common Armenian surname.

It may refer to:

Andrey Safaryan (born 1966), Kazakhstani sprint canoer of Armenian descent
David Safaryan (born 1989), Armenian freestyle wrestler
Styopa Safaryan (born 1973), Armenian politician

See also
Safaryants

Armenian-language surnames